Jesse De Vorska (July 13, 1898 – December 27, 1999) was a Russian-born American film actor.

Selected filmography
 The Unknown Soldier (1926)
 Rose of the Tenements (1926)
 Jake the Plumber (1927)
 Around the Corner (1930)
 The Last Parade (1931)
 Women of All Nations (1931)
 Goldie (1931)
 The Spider (1931)
 Symphony of Six Million (1932)
 The Strange Love of Molly Louvain (1932)
 Pier 13 (1932)
 Employees Entrance (1933)
 Wine, Women and Song (1933)
 The Call of the Wild (1935)

References

Bibliography
 James L. Neibaur. James Cagney Films of the 1930s. Rowman & Littlefield, 2014.

External links

1898 births
1999 deaths
American centenarians
American male film actors
Russian male film actors
Emigrants from the Russian Empire to the United States
Actors from Kaunas
People from Kovensky Uyezd
20th-century American male actors
Men centenarians